Aboutaleb is an Arabic surname. Notable people with the surname include:

A. A. AbouTaleb, Egyptian squash player
Ahmed Aboutaleb (born 1961), Dutch-Moroccan politician and mayor of Rotterdam
Saeid Aboutaleb (born 1969), Iranian documentary filmmaker and politician
Nouraldin Aboutaleb (born 2000), Egyptian civil engineer and computer scientist.
 Leena Aboutaleb (born 1996), Egyptian-Palestinian writer.

Arabic-language surnames